Hot Stuff the Little Devil is a comic book character created by Warren Kremer who first appeared in Hot Stuff #1 (October 1957), published by Harvey Comics. Imbued with a mischievous personality and able to produce fire, Hot Stuff appears as a red child devil who wears a diaper (said to be made of asbestos) and carries a magical sentient pitchfork (referred to as his "trusty trident"), which is a character in its own right.  Much to the consternation of his demonic brethren, Hot Stuff sometimes performs good deeds to irritate them.

Publication history
Created and first drawn by Warren Kremer, Hot Stuff has appeared in at least eight comic book titles including:
Hot Stuff Sizzlers (1960)
Devil Kids Starring Hot Stuff (1962)
Hot Stuff Creepy Caves (1974)
as well as multiple back-up stories between the periods 1957-1982 and 1986-1991, along with sporadic appearances in other publications during the 1990s and 2000s. The most recent appearance of Hot Stuff was in 2009 with Casper the Friendly Ghost and Wendy the Good Little Witch, when a three-issue comic book miniseries was published by Arden Entertainment called Casper and the Spectrals.

Warren Kremer and Howard Post were the artists who helped define the look of Hot Stuff, drawing many comic book covers and stories over the years. Ernie Colón was another major comics artist who drew Hot Stuff.

While Harvey Comics flagship characters Casper the Friendly Ghost, Spooky and Wendy the Good Little Witch often crossed over into each other's stories, Hot Stuff rarely appeared with them. Instead, the little devil would be featured with characters like Stumbo the Giant (created by Warren Kremer and Larz Bourne, and appeared in back-up stories in Hot Stuff comics in 1957), Katnip the cat, Herman the mouse and good fairy Princess Charma. While they often tended to annoy or anger Hot Stuff, their appearances served to further develop Hot Stuff's character.

Comic book series
 Hot Stuff the Little Devil
 Devil Kids Starring Hot Stuff
 Hot Stuff Creepy Caves
 Hot Stuff Sizzlers
 Hot Stuff Digest 
 Harvey Wiseguys
 Astro Comics
 Casper And...
 Hot Stuff the Little Devil, Vol. 2
 Casper and his Friends Magazine (Marvel Comics)
 Casper and the Spectrals
 Hot Stuff the Little Devil Halloween Special (Dark House Comics)
 Harvey Comics Treasury (Dark House comics)
 Harvey Hits (Joe Books)
 Casper the Friendly Ghost (American Mythology Productions)

Legacy and influence
Hot Stuff the Little Devil is the unofficial emblem for the 108th Field Battery-Royal Australian Artillery and the 407 Long Range Patrol Squadron of the Canadian Forces. He is the mascot for Dysart High School located in El Mirage, Arizona, Eagle Valley High School in Gypsum, Colorado, and Lindhurst High School in Olivehurst, California, and a blue version of Hot Stuff is the logo for Fort Morgan Middle School in Fort Morgan, Colorado. He was the mascot of Joey Harrison's Surf Club in Seaside Heights, New Jersey, and was also the inspiration for the logo of the Chicago based street gang Satan Disciples. Additionally, he is the mascot for the Austin-based restaurant Torchy's Tacos. 

The Old Jail Museum in Crawfordsville, Indiana has an image of Hot Stuff on a cell wall as drawn by one of the inmates.

Hot Stuff makes a cameo in a 2014 episode of The Simpsons titled "Treehouse of Horror XXV", in which he was put in "Super Hell" for how "lame" his comics are.

Hot Stuff made an official appearance in a 2020 episode of Harvey Girls Forever!, based on Harvey Comics characters, as a hot sauce mascot.

Film
As of 2014, DreamWorks Animation was developing a live-action/CGI film based on the character with Lizzie and Wendy Molyneux set to write it. It would be the second attempt for a DreamWorks Animation film to use live-action and computer-animation. It will be the second DreamWorks animated film to feature characters from the Classic Media library; the first was Mr. Peabody & Sherman.

References

External links 
 Hot Stuff the Little Devil at Don Markstein's Toonopedia. Archived from the original on February 5, 2016.
 407 LRP Squadron hat, as sold by the 407 Squadron kit shop, with a modified Hot Stuff logo.

Harvey Comics series and characters
Harvey Comics titles
Fictional demons and devils
DreamWorks Classics
1957 comics debuts
Humor comics
Fantasy comics
Comics characters introduced in 1957
Child characters in comics
Casper characters